Centrespread is a futuristic Ozploitation movie about a jaded photographer for sex magazines who has been commissioned to find a girl with "a new look, a different approach, someone for the new century."

Production
Producer Wayne Groom said they "want to find an unknown girl" for the lead "and make her a star."

The movie was shot in Adelaide at the South Australian Film Corporation's studios. Filming began in September 1980.

Reception
The film was released in 1981. David Stratton described the film as "atrocious". Most reviews were poor.

References

External links

Centrespread at Oz Movies

1981 films
Australian science fiction films
Films set in South Australia
1980s English-language films
Australian exploitation films
1980s Australian films